Inside contracting is the practice of hiring contractors who work inside the proprietor's factory.  It replaced the putting out system, where contractors worked in their own facilities.  Inside contracting was the system favored by the Springfield and Harper's Ferry Armories.  Since the manufacturing system developed in the armories also became popular (the American system of manufacturing), manufacturers in the early 19th century tended to hire people trained in the armories as managers.  They brought with them the practice of inside contracting.

The manufacturer hired inside contractors and provided materials and machinery.  Each inside contractor was expected to hire his own employees and meet certain production and quality goals, but everything else was left to him.  As a result, the system rewarded ingenuity, but also rewarded local optimization.  For example, it was to the inside contractor's benefit to allow machinery to deteriorate toward the end of his contract since maintenance was costly and he might not reap the long-term benefit if he didn't get another contract.  The system was eventually replaced with the factory system, in which everyone was an employee of the manufacturer directly.

See also
Independent contractor

References

Late modern economic history
Business economics